Zapoteca portoricensis subsp. portoricensis is a perennial tree.

References

portoricensis subsp. portoricensis
Plant subspecies